Frédéric Vercheval is a Belgian musician and composer. He studied at the Jazz Studio, a music school of Antwerp, Belgium. Vercheval was nominated for the Magritte Award for Best Original Score five times for his work in Diamant 13 (2009), Krach (2010), Not My Type (2014), Melody (2014) and Mothers' Instinct (2019).

References

External links
 

Belgian jazz musicians
Belgian film score composers
Male film score composers
Year of birth missing (living people)
Living people
Male jazz musicians
Magritte Award winners